2002 in Russian football was the first season of the Premier League, which was won by FC Lokomotiv Moscow (this was their first ever national title). The national team participated in the 2002 FIFA World Cup.

National team
Russia national football team participated in the final tournament of the 2002 FIFA World Cup, where they finished third in Group H.

 Russia score given first

Key
 H = Home match
 A = Away match
 N = Neutral ground
 F = Friendly
 FT = Friendly tournament
 WC = 2002 FIFA World Cup, Group H
 ECQ = 2004 UEFA European Football Championship qualifying, Group 10

Leagues

Premier League

First Division
Rubin Kazan and Chernomorets Novorossiysk won the promotion from the First Division.

Vyacheslav Kamoltsev of Chernomorets became the top goalscorer with 20 goals.

Second Division
The following clubs have earned promotion by winning tournaments in their respective Second Division zones:
 FC Baltika Kaliningrad (West)
 FC Metallurg Lipetsk (Centre)
 FC Terek Grozny (South)
 FC Svetotekhnika Saransk (Povolzhye)
 FC Uralmash Yekaterinburg (Ural)
 FC Metallurg-Zapsib Novokuznetsk (East)

Cup
The Russian Cup was won by CSKA Moscow, who beat Zenit Saint Petersburg 2–0 in the final at the Luzhniki Stadium.

UEFA club competitions

2001–02 UEFA Cup 
Lokomotiv Moscow participated in the third round of the 2001–02 UEFA Cup, but were knocked out by Hapoel Tel Aviv FC who won 3–1 on aggregate.

2002 UEFA Intertoto Cup
Krylya Sovetov Samara played in the 2002 UEFA Intertoto Cup. After defeating Dinaburg FC in the second round they lost to Willem II Tilburg on away goals.

2002–03 UEFA Champions League 
Lokomotiv Moscow's victory over Grazer AK ensured there are two Russian clubs in the group stage of the 2002–03 UEFA Champions League. Lokomotiv finished second in the group with Club Brugge, Galatasaray, and the dominant FC Barcelona.

On the contrary, Spartak Moscow, the automatic qualifiers for the group stage, lost all their matches to Valencia CF, FC Basel, and Liverpool F.C., finishing with the goal differential of 1–18.

2002–03 UEFA Cup 
Zenit Saint Petersburg set the record for aggregate score for the Russian teams, beating FC Encamp 13–0 in the qualifying round of the 2002–03 UEFA Cup and joining CSKA Moscow in the first round. Both Russian clubs lost in the first round, Zenit to Grasshopper Club Zürich (3–4) and CSKA to Parma F.C. (3–4).

References
National team fixtures 
League and cup results
UEFA Champions League results 
UEFA Cup results: 2001–02 2002–03
UEFA Intertoto Cup results

 
Seasons in Russian football